Nao Hibino and Alicja Rosolska were the defending champions, but both players chose not to participate.

Belinda Bencic and Yanina Wickmayer won the title after defeating Mihaela Buzărnescu and Nicola Geuer 7–6(9–7), 6–3 in the final.

Seeds

Draw

References
Main Draw

Internationaux Féminins de la Vienne - Doubles